London has become one of the most ethnically diverse cities in the world with over 300 languages are spoken in Greater London.

At the 2021 census, London had a population of 8,799,720. Around 37% of the population were born outside the UK.

History and ethnic breakdown of London 

Notes:

 New category for 2001 census
 New category for 2011 census
 In 2001, listed under 'Other' ethnic group heading

Racial breakdown of London

White population of London 
At the 2011 census, the total White population of London stood at 4,887,435.

Whites form a majority of London's population and are evenly spread. Bromley has the highest White British population as well as highest total White, while Newham has the lowest for both. Brent has the highest White Irish population, while Bexley has the highest White Gypsy/Irish Traveller population and Haringey has the highest for Other White (non-British/Irish/Gypsy/Irish Traveller white).

The table below shows the population by numbers in the top 20 boroughs.

Black population of London
At the 2011 census, the total Black population of London stood at 1,101,688. This is a rise of 39% from the 2001 census, when the population stood at 781,751.

Inner London and Outer London have a near-equal black population. The 2011 census is the first time that the black population in Outer London has overtaken that of Inner London:

The black population of London is noticeably concentrated in South London, with the four boroughs with the highest black populations overall all south of the river, and Greenwich also featuring inside the top 10. Southwark has the highest Black African population, Croydon has the highest Black Caribbean population, and Lambeth has the highest total black population in London. In Southwark, Greenwich and Newham, the Black African population is significantly higher than Black Caribbean; conversely, Lewisham and Brent are almost balanced, and Croydon is the only borough where the Black Caribbean population exceeds the Black African one.

The twenty London boroughs with the highest total Black population (Black African, Black Caribbean and Other Black) are listed below:

Asian population of London

At the 2011 census, the total Asian population of London stood at 1,511,546. This is a rise of 60% from the 2001 census, when the population stood at 947,425.

Outer London has a greater Asian population than Inner London:

The Asian population of London is noticeably concentrated in East and West London. Harrow has the highest Indian population, Redbridge has the highest Pakistani population, Tower Hamlets has the highest Bangladeshi population and Barnet has the highest Chinese population. Newham has the highest total Asian population in London. The twenty London boroughs with the highest total Asian population (Indian, Pakistani, Bangladeshi, Chinese and Other Asian) are listed below.

Foreign-born population

At the 2011 census, 36.7% of London's population was foreign born (including 24.5% born outside of Europe), with 3,082,000 residents born abroad in 2014. London has the largest population number (not percentage) of foreign-born residents of any UK city.

Significant ethnic minority communities

Arabs

Significant migration from Arab countries to the UK began in the 1940s, mostly by Egyptians. Other waves followed, such as Lebanese fleeing the civil war. The centre of London has a thriving Arab community, centred around Edgware Road.

Bangladeshis

A major wave of immigration began in the 1970s, as people from the Sylhet Division arrived in London, fleeing poverty and the Bangladesh Liberation War. Many settled around Brick Lane (Banglatown), where they entered the textile trade. This trade has declined causing unemployment, but the community has moved into other businesses, including restaurants and banking. The level of immigration peaked in 1986 and has since entered a decline with the introduction of stricter immigration laws.

The community remains concentrated around Bethnal Green and Whitechapel and has spread into other east London boroughs. London as a city is home to the single largest number of people of Bangladeshi origin outside of Bangladesh, with close to 200,000 individuals being of full Bangladeshi origin in 2007.

The community also annually hosts Europe's largest outdoor Asian event known as the Boishakhi Mela as part of the Bengali New Year celebrations.

Chinese

Chinese people constitute the fourth largest Asian group in London (behind the Indians, Pakistanis and Bangladeshis respectively); numbering 114,800 in 2007, they are spread more or less across the entire city and have become successful in British life, especially when it comes to cuisine. The history of the Chinese in London is long and complex, with the first Chinese people arriving in the city in the 19th century as sailors.

Germans

Fiona Moore, author of "The German School in London, UK: Fostering the Next Generation of National Cosmopolitans?", wrote that the London German community "relies on subtle network connections rather than the displaying of obvious membership traits", since London Germans attended the same churches, joined the same clubs, and sent their children to the same schools. According to Moore this aspect was likely influenced by the outcomes of World War I and World War II, resulting in encouragement for UK-based Germans "to try to blend in to a greater degree than elsewhere."

The German business and expatriate community is centred on the London Borough of Richmond upon Thames, which houses the German School London (DSL) and most German expatriates residing in London. Moore wrote that the borough "does not immediately show signs of hosting a German community" due to a lack of obvious German businesses and storefronts, but that most residents know of the location of the DSL and that there are "more subtle signs of German presence."

German expatriates are located throughout London. Some of them do not go to the Borough of Richmond upon Thames even though the centre of the German community is located there.

Ghanaians

Besides Nigerians, Ghanaians are one of the largest Black African groups in London, with the majority living in the boroughs of Southwark, Lambeth, Newham, Hackney, Haringey, Lewisham, Merton, Waltham Forest, Croydon, Enfield and Brent.

Greeks

According to the "History of London's Greek community" by Jonathan Harris, the Greek population of London numbered several thousand by 1870 AD whereas in 1850 AD it was just a few hundred. The 2001 Census recorded 12,360 Greek-born people living in London, with particular concentrations in the Hyde Park, Regent's Park, Chelsea and Kensington Census tracts.

The Census tracts with the highest number of Cypriot-born people in 2001 were Palmers Green, Upper Edmonton, Cockfosters, Lower Edmonton, Tottenham North and Tottenham South. Many Greek-Cypriots reside in Wood Green, Harringay and Palmers Green, the latter harbouring the largest community of Greek-Cypriots outside Cyprus, resulting in these areas bearing local nicknames whereby the Green is replaced by Greek – as in Greek Lanes and Palmers Greek.

According to a City of London Corporation sponsored report, there are between 280,600 and 310,000 Greek speakers in Greater London.

The Greek Primary School of London and the Greek Secondary School of London both serve the community.

Indians

British Indians have long been one of London's largest ethnic minority groups and in 2007 over 500,000 Indians were residing in London (this excludes people of half or less Indian origin). Around 7% of London's population is of Indian origin. Indians have been in the British capital for generations and come from all walks of life. They are influential in the city's culture and are major contributors to London's workforce and economy.

Southall, Hounslow and Wembley have significant Indian populations.

Irish

Irish migration to Great Britain has a lengthy history due to the close proximity of, and complex relationship between, the islands of Ireland and Great Britain and the various political entities that have ruled them. Today, millions of residents of Great Britain are either from the island of Ireland or have Irish ancestry. Around six million Britons have an Irish grandfather or grandmother (approximately 10% of the UK population). 900,000 ethnic Irish people live in the capital (12% of the city's population); despite this, some sources put the population of people of Irish descent in London at 77% (some five and a half million people), although the White British and White Irish populations combined are less than this. The highest numbers of the Irish population is in the North and West London boroughs of Brent and Ealing.

Jamaicans

This has since become an important landmark in the history of modern multicultural Britain. During the post World War II era, the presence of the Caribbean Community was requested to help reconstruct the British economy. Employers such as British Rail, the NHS and London transport recruited almost exclusively from Jamaica. Some 250,000 Londoners are of Jamaican origin. Brixton and Harlesden are considered the community's cultural capitals.

Japanese

Junko Sakai, author of Japanese Bankers in the City of London: Language, Culture and Identity in the Japanese Diaspora, stated that there is no particular location for the Japanese community in London, but that the families of Japanese "company men" have a tendency of living in North London and West London. Japanese restaurants and shops are located around these groups of Japanese people.

Jews

While Jews normally refer to followers of Judaism, they legally also count as an ethnicity and are considered so by some members. London has the second largest Jewish community in Europe after Paris, numbering some 160,000, particularly in North London. Districts with a high concentration include Finchley, Mill Hill, Edgware, Stanmore, Golders Green, Hendon, Hampstead Garden Suburb, Highgate, and further east the Hasidic-strong exclave in Stamford Hill & South Tottenham.

Koreans

As of 2014 there were about 10,000 ethnic Koreans in New Malden proper, and as of the same year the Korean population in the area around New Malden is around 20,000, including about 600 originating from North Korea, giving it the largest group of North Koreans in Europe. Many of the Koreans living in New Malden work for Korean companies, and they are either permanently settled and formerly expatriate, or they are still expatriates. In 2015 Paul Fischer of The Independent wrote that the North Koreans were insular, and that there were tensions between the South Korean majority and the North Koreans in New Malden.

The New Malden area has Korean-language churches and nursery schools as well as restaurants and shops with Korean clientele. The area has Korean supermarkets, about 20 Korean restaurants and cafes, including those serving bulgogi. It also has a noraebang (Karaoke bar). The Korean language is visible on several shop signs. The original Embassy of South Korea to the United Kingdom is in Malden.

Some factors cited in The Telegraph as reasons why the Korean community formed in New Malden included a 1950s joint venture partnership between a chaebol and Racal Avionics (formerly Dacca), Lord Chancellor's Walk in Coombe Lane West previously serving as the residence of the Ambassador of South Korea to the United Kingdom, and Samsung Electronics having its UK offices in New Malden until they moved to their current location in Chertsey, Surrey in 2005. Many Koreans settled in New Malden in the 1970s due to the ambassador's location.

There is a newspaper published in New Malden, Free NK, which is opposed to the government of North Korea.

Lithuanians

The Lithuanian community in London goes back to at least the early 20th century. Most of the community came in a wave of Eastern European immigration in the 2000s, after Lithuania joined the European Union.

Most of London's Lithuanians live in the boroughs of Barking and Dagenham, Newham, Redbridge and Waltham Forest, with smaller numbers elsewhere. The main Lithuanian-speaking Roman Catholic church, St Casimir's, however, lies in Bethnal Green.

Nigerians

London (in particular the southern boroughs) is home to the largest Nigerian community in the UK, and possibly the largest overseas Nigerian community in the world. The first recorded Nigerian in London was Olaudah Equiano who came to Britain after escaping from slavery over 200 years ago, becoming a member of the abolitionist Sons of Africa group.

In the mid-20th century a wave of Nigerian immigrants came to London.  Civil and political unrest in the country contributed to numerous refugees arriving in England. The vast majority of famous and notable British people of Nigerian origin were either born in or now live in London.

Peckham (also known as Little Lagos and Yorubatown) is home to one of the largest overseas Nigerian communities in the world; many of the local establishments are Yoruba-owned. Nigerian churches and mosques can be found in the area. As immigrants become assimilated, English is becoming the predominant language of the local Nigerian British population.  The Yoruba language is declining in use in the Peckham area despite the increasing Nigerian population. In 2001, about 7% of Peckham's population was born in Nigeria. A much larger proportion of the ward's 60% Black population is of Nigerian descent, as 40% are of other African descent.

Pakistanis

Pakistanis in London form the largest concentrated community of British Pakistanis; immigration from regions which now form Pakistan predate Pakistan's independence. The main concentrations of Pakistani settlement in London are found in Outer London with the boroughs of Redbridge, Newham and Waltham Forest accounting for nearly a third of Londoners of Pakistani descent.

Polish

London has had a notable Polish community since the Second World War. Many of the migrants from Poland in the 1940s were soldiers and their families. The Polish Government in Exile was based in London until it was dissolved in 1991 following the restoration of democracy in Poland. In the 2000s a wave of Polish immigrants came to Britain, including London, after Poland joined the European Union. As of 2016, Poles now account for about 4.5 per cent of London's foreign-born population.

The boroughs of Ealing, Enfield, Kensington and Chelsea, Haringey, Lambeth, Lewisham and Wandsworth have significant numbers of Poles living there. The Church of the Evangelist in Putney is one of several Polish-speaking Roman Catholic churches in London, and the Polish Social and Cultural Association in Hammersmith is the community's main centre. Polish-style shops, with their distinctive red and white signs accompanied by words in the Polish language, can be found in many parts of London.

Romanian
There has been a growing Romanian community in London since World War II. In the 2000s a wave of Romanian immigrants came to the UK, including London, after Romania joined the European Union.

A particularly concentrated community exists in the Edgware-London suburb of Burnt Oak which has gained the nickname "Little Romania" or "Little Bucharest". Most Romanians belong to the Romanian Orthodox religion.

Romanichal

Roma are concentrated in north and east London.

Sri Lankans

There is a large Sri Lankan community in London. The population of Sri Lankans in London was 50,000 in 2001 and 84,000 in 2011. British Sri Lankans in London (mainly Tamils) can be found in Harrow (West London) and Tooting (South London). They have a long presence in the UK dating back to the colonial times in the 19th century. However, the majority came as refugees during the Sri Lankan Civil War.

Thai

Turkish

London is home to the largest Turkish community in the UK. The boroughs of Enfield, Haringey and Hackney have a significant number of Turkish inhabitants. A large Turkish-cypriot community is also present in boroughs of South London such as Lambeth and Croydon.

Gallery

See also

Demography of London

Notes

References 
 Moore, Fiona. "The German School in London, UK: Fostering the Next Generation of National Cosmopolitans?" (Chapter 4). In: Coles, Anne and Anne-Meike Fechter. Gender and Family Among Transnational Professionals (Routledge International Studies of Women and Place). Routledge, 6 August 2012. , 9781134156207.

Reference notes

Further reading
 Cherti, Miriam. Paradoxes of Social Capital: A Multi-generational Study of Moroccans in London (IMISCOE dissertations Sussex theses; S 6271). Amsterdam University Press, 2008. , 9789053560327.

External links
 Ethnicity Profiles: London by the Commission for Racial Equality
 Mapping Where Immigrants Settle in London, Street by Street

 
Culture in London